Keisuke Monguchi (門口佳佑, born 25 May 1995) is a Japanese kickboxer, currently competing in the featherweight division of RISE, where he is the current RISE featherweight champion.

As of August 2021, he is the #10 ranked Super Flyweight in the world, according to Combat Press.

Kickboxing career

RISE
Monguchi made his professional debut against Masaaki Ono on July 16, 2018. He won the fight by a third-round right hook knockout.

Monguchi was scheduled to make his second professional appearance against Kojiro Flysky Gym at RISE 127 on September 16, 2018. The fight was ruled a majority draw.

Monguchi was scheduled to face Hyuma Hitachi at RISE 128 on November 2, 2018. He won the fight by a first-round technical knockout.

Monguchi fought another Target Shibuya gym representative, YA-MAN, at RISE 130 on February 3, 2019. He won the fight by unanimous decision, with scores of 30–28, 29–28 and 29–27.

Monguchi made his first appearance at a RISE EVOL event, being scheduled to face Teppei Tsuda at RISE EVOL.3 on April 26, 2019. It was the first RISE ranked opponent that Monguchi faced in his career. He won the fight by unanimous decision, with scores of 30–26, 30–26 and 30–27.

Monguchi was scheduled to face the 2018 RISE Rookies Cup winner Naoki Yamada at RISE WORLD SERIES 2019 Semi-Final Round in OSAKA on July 21, 2019. He won the fight by split decision.

Monguchi faced Ryuji Horio at RISE 135 on November 4, 2019. He won the fight by a convincing unanimous decision, with all three judges awarding him every single round of the bout.

Monguchi was scheduled to face Kensei Yamakawa at RISE 137 on February 23, 2020. He won the fight by unanimous decision, winning all three rounds on all three of the judges' scorecards.

Monguchi faced Taiki Sawatani at RISE 143 on November 14, 2020. He won the fight by unanimous decision, with scores of 29–28, 30–28 and 30–28.

Monguchi suffered the first loss of his professional career at the hands of Masaki Takeuchi at RISE 145 on January 30, 2021. Takeuchi won the fight by unanimous decision, with one scorecard of 30–29 in his favor, and two scorecards of 30–28 in his favor.

Monguchi was scheduled to fight Ryoga Hirano at Rise on Abema 2 on May 16, 2021. He won the fight by unanimous decision, with scores of 30–29, 30–28 and 30–28.

Monguchi was scheduled to face Kaito at Rise World Series 2021 on July 18, 2021. Kaito utilized his longer reach to win the closely contested bout by split decision, with scores of 30–29, 30–29 and 29–30.

Monguchi was booked to face Yoshinobu Ozaki at RISE 155 on February 23, 2022. He won the fight by a first-round technical knockout, after successfully knocking Ozaki down three times by the 1:51 minute mark of the opening round.

RISE Featherweight champion
Monguchi challenged the reigning RISE featherweight champion Taisei Umei at RISE 161 on August 28, 2022. He won the fight by unanimous decision, with two judges scoring the bout 50–46 for him, while the third judge scored all five rounds of the bout in his favor.

Monguchi faced Kotaro Yamada in a Shootboxing rules bout at RISE WORLD SERIES / SHOOTBOXING-KINGS on December 25, 2022. He won the fight by unanimous decision, with two scorecards of 29–26 and one scorecard of 29–25. Monguchi twice knocked his opponent down in the third round, the first time with a flying knee and the second time with a right hook. Yamada scored a shoot point in the second round with a hip throw.

Monguchi faced the former Krush Featherweight champion Takahito Niimi at RISE ELDORADO 2023 on March 26, 2023.

Titles and accomplishments

Kickboxing
RISE
 2022 RISE Featherweight Championship

Karate
 2015 WKO Shinkyokyushinkai All Kanto Weight Championship Lightweight Runner-up
 2017 WKO Shinkyokyushinkai All Kanto Weight Championship Lightweight Runner-up

Fight record

|- style="background:#;"
| 2023-03-26 || ||align=left| Takahito Niimi || RISE ELDORADO 2023 || Tokyo, Japan || ||  ||
|-  style="background:#cfc;"
| 2022-12-25|| Win ||align=left| Kotaro Yamada || RISE WORLD SERIES / SHOOTBOXING-KINGS|| Tokyo, Japan || Decision (Unanimous) ||  3||3:00
|-

|-  style="text-align:center; background:#cfc"
| 2022-08-28 || Win || align=left| Taisei Umei || RISE 161 || Tokyo, Japan || Decision (Unanimous) ||  5||3:00
|-
! style=background:white colspan=9 |

|-  style="text-align:center; background:#cfc;"
| 2022-02-23 || Win ||align=left| Yoshinobu Ozaki || RISE 155 || Tokyo, Japan || TKO (Three knockdowns) || 1 || 1:51

|-  style="text-align:center; background:#fbb;"
| 2021-07-18 || Loss ||align=left| Kaito Sakaguchi || Rise World Series 2021 || Osaka, Japan || Decision (Split) || 3 || 3:00 

|-  style="text-align:center; background:#cfc;"
| 2021-05-16 || Win ||align=left| Ryoga Hirano || Rise on Abema 2 || Ōta, Tokyo, Japan || Decision (Unanimous) || 3 || 3:00 

|-  style="text-align:center; background:#fbb;"
| 2021-01-30 || Loss ||align=left| Masaki Takeuchi || RISE 145 || Bunkyo, Tokyo, Japan || Decision (Unanimous) || 3 || 3:00 

|-  style="text-align:center; background:#cfc;"
| 2020-11-14 || Win ||align=left| Taiki Sawatani || RISE 143 || Bunkyo, Tokyo, Japan || Decision (Unanimous) || 3 || 3:00 

|-  style="text-align:center; background:#cfc;"
| 2020-02-23 || Win ||align=left| Kensei Yamakawa || RISE 137 || Tokyo, Japan || Decision (Unanimous) || 3 || 3:00 

|-  style="text-align:center; background:#cfc;"
| 2019-11-04 || Win ||align=left| Ryuji Horio || RISE 135 || Tokyo, Japan || Decision (Unanimous) || 3 || 3:00 

|-  style="text-align:center; background:#cfc;"
| 2019-07-21 || Win ||align=left| Naoki Yamada || RISE WORLD SERIES 2019 Semi-Final Round in OSAKA || Osaka, Japan || Decision (Split) || 3 || 3:00 

|-  style="text-align:center; background:#cfc;"
| 2019-04-26 || Win ||align=left| Teppei Tsuda || RISE EVOL.3 || Tokyo, Japan || Decision (Unanimous) || 3 || 3:00 

|-  style="text-align:center; background:#cfc;"
| 2019-02-03 || Win ||align=left| YA-MAN || RISE 130 || Tokyo, Japan || Decision (Unanimous) || 3 || 3:00

|-  style="text-align:center; background:#cfc;"
| 2018-11-02 || Win ||align=left| Hyuma Hitachi || RISE 128 || Tokyo, Japan || TKO (Punches) || 1 || 1:53

|-  style="text-align:center; background:#c5d2ea;"
| 2018-09-16 || Draw ||align=left| Kojiro Flysky Gym || RISE 127 || Tokyo, Japan || Decision (Majority) || 3 || 3:00 

|-  style="text-align:center; background:#cfc;"
| 2018-07-16 || Win ||align=left| Masaaki Ono || RISE 126 || Tokyo, Japan || KO (Right hook) || 3 || 0:48 
|-
| colspan=9 | Legend:

See also
 List of male kickboxers

References

Japanese kickboxers
1995 births
Living people
Japanese male kickboxers
Sportspeople from Osaka Prefecture